The canton of Charente-Sud is an administrative division in the Charente department, France. It was created following the French canton reorganisation which came into effect in March 2015 from the former cantons of Barbezieux-Saint-Hilaire, Blanzac-Porcheresse and Brossac. It consists of 46 communes (9 of which merged into the new communes Val-des-Vignes, Montmérac and Coteaux du Blanzacais):

Angeduc
Baignes-Sainte-Radegonde
Barbezieux-Saint-Hilaire
Barret
Bécheresse
Berneuil
Boisbreteau
Bors
Brie-sous-Barbezieux
Brossac
Challignac
Champagne-Vigny
Chantillac
Chillac
Condéon
Coteaux du Blanzacais
Étriac
Guimps
Guizengeard
Lachaise
Ladiville
Lagarde-sur-le-Né
Montmérac
Oriolles
Passirac
Pérignac
Reignac
Saint-Aulais-la-Chapelle
Saint-Bonnet
Sainte-Souline
Saint-Félix
Saint-Médard
Saint-Palais-du-Né
Saint-Vallier
Salles-de-Barbezieux
Sauvignac
Le Tâtre
Touvérac
Val-des-Vignes
Vignolles

See also
Cantons of the Charente department 
Communes of France

References

Cantons of Charente